Super Turrican may refer to:

Super Turrican (1992 video game), a 1992 video game developed by Rainbow Arts
Super Turrican (1993 video game), a 1993 video game developed by Factor 5
Super Turrican 2, a 1995 video game developed by Factor 5